The Palazzo Emo alla Maddalena is a Baroque-style palace on the Grand Canal, between the Palazzo Molin Querini and the Palazzo Soranzo Piovene in the sestiere of Cannaregio, in Venice, Italy. It is located in the church parish of La Maddalena, Venice.

It was built in the 17th century and occupied by the family of the Admiral Angelo Emo. His family owned the palace into the 19th century. There are at least three other palaces related to the Emo family on the Grand Canal:
Palazzo Emo Diedo
Palazzo Emo a San Leonardo (Cannaregio)
Palazzo Barozzi Emo Treves de Bonfili

References

Houses completed in the 18th century
Emo at Maddalena
Emo at Maddalena
Baroque architecture in Venice